Manos: The Hands of Fate is a video game developed and published by FreakZone Games, based on the cult film Manos: The Hands of Fate (1966). It was published in 2012 for iOS, with retro graphics and sound inspired by the 8-bit era for the Nintendo Entertainment System. It was later ported to Windows and Android. Manos: The Hands of Fate features Mike, a husband and father who attempts to expunge a man known as "The Master" in order to escape a lodge and rescue his family.

Plot

Lost while on vacation, Mike, his wife Margaret, and their daughter Debbie roam the desert for shelter. They discover the Valley Lodge, maintained by a satyr named Torgo, who "take[s] care of the place while the master is away". Mike fights and defeats Torgo, and then enters the building, which is infested with paranormal beings, which Mike must defeat to rescue his missing family. Eventually, Mike returns outside. He flies an airplane and discovers that the Master of the lodge, has kidnapped Mike's family. The Master instructs his six wives to attack Mike, and then kills Torgo, declaring he has failed him. After Mike defeats the wives, he battles the Master.

If the player has collected all of the Hands of Fate hidden across the game, a good ending appears, in which Mike and his family leave the Valley Lodge, with Mike telling two women that it is not worth staying at. If they have not, they will view the bad ending, with Mike standing alone at the door, telling the same women that he "takes care of the place while the Master is away".

Development
The idea of creating a Manos-themed video game was a running joke between developer Sam Beddoes and his friend. Beddoes realized the film was in the public domain and that making such a game would be legally possible. The initial idea was to resemble Shadowgate for NES; however, after watching an episode of Angry Video Game Nerd, Beddoes realized "what Manos was destined to be". When asked by Eurogamer how they could turn the movie into a video game, the developers replied "[B]y latching onto memorable moments in the movie and blowing them wildly out of proportion!", noting that a kissing couple drinking beer in the film are represented in the game as an enemy that throws beer bottles at the player.

Manos: The Hands of Fate contains references to Mystery Science Theater 3000 episodes and films; however, they were made intentionally obscure to avoid copyright infringement. During the MST3K Kickstarter telethon, the Game Grumps played the game along with Crow T. Robot in MST3Ks trademark "Shadowrama" style.

Reception

Manos: The Hands of Fate has received mixed reviews from critics. Cody Musser, reviewing the iOS version for IGN, gave it a 6.0 out of 10. He praised the graphics and sound, but criticized the controls, bugs, and hit detection. A review of the Windows version for ScrewAttack gave it a 6.5 out of 10. They praised the gameplay, graphics, and sound, but said it is too easy and short.

References

External links
 Official site

2012 video games
Android (operating system) games
IOS games
Parody video games
Platform games
Polygamy in fiction
Retro-style video games
Side-scrolling video games
Single-player video games
Video games based on films
Video games developed in the United Kingdom
Video games set in Texas
Windows games
Works about vacationing